Hemet High School  is a public high school of approximately 2,500 students located in East Hemet, California and is part of the Hemet Unified School District. Hemet High is accredited by the WASC Accrediting Commission for Schools. From its founding in 1894 to 1965 the school was known as Hemet Union High School.

History
Hemet High School was first founded in 1894 and has been moved to different campus sites in the past. The school has been operating at its present campus site since 1972. Hemet High is accredited by the WASC, NATEF, and AYES Accrediting Commissions for Schools. The campus began construction expansion again, including the addition of two new academic buildings, a theater, and several shade structures, completed during the summer of 2012 (first being used in the 2012-2013 school year).

The school was used as an evacuation center during the Mountain Fire in July 2013.

Sports

Fall season
•Football

•Girls' Volleyball

•Cross Country

•Girls' Golf

•Girls' Tennis

•Boys' Water Polo

Winter Season
•Boys' Basketball

•Girls' Basketball

•Boys' Soccer

•Girls' Soccer

•Wrestling

•Girls' Water Polo

Spring Season
•Baseball

•Softball

•Boys' Track & Field

•Girls' Track & Field

•Boys' tennis

•Boys' Swimming

•Girls' Swimming

Boys’ lacrosse

Girls’ lacrosse

References

External links
 
 

High schools in Riverside County, California
Hemet, California
Public high schools in California
1894 establishments in California